The 2020 North Carolina Education Lottery 200 was a NASCAR Gander RV & Outdoors Truck Series race held on May 26, 2020, at Charlotte Motor Speedway in Concord, North Carolina. Contested over 134 laps on the 1.5-mile (2.4 km) asphalt speedway, it was the third race of the 2020 NASCAR Gander RV & Outdoors Truck Series season. For the first time since February, this was the first truck race to resume the season after a two-month hold due to the COVID-19 pandemic. Chase Elliott, driving for GMS Racing, won the race, his first truck win since 2017. Elliott had also won the $100K bounty, that was declared by Kevin Harvick, to any full-time Cup Series drivers that can beat Kyle Busch in a truck race. John Hunter Nemechek, Garrett Smithley, and Timmy Hill also competed for the bounty. Erik Jones was scheduled to also compete for it, but due to having no owner points for his team, Wauters Motorsports, he failed to qualify for the race.

Entry list

Qualifying 
Due to the pandemic, there would be no practice or qualifying, starting lineup would be determined by owner points.

Qualifying results

Race

Stage Results 
Stage One Laps: 37

Stage Two Laps: 30

Final Stage Results 
Stage Three Laps: 54

References

2020 in sports in North Carolina
North Carolina Education Lottery 200
NASCAR races at Charlotte Motor Speedway
2020 NASCAR Gander RV & Outdoors Truck Series